Chen Yen-ping (born 20 August 1991) is a Taiwanese footballer who plays as a midfielder for Taiwan Mulan Football League club Inter Taoyuan and the Chinese Taipei women's national team.

International goals

References

1991 births
Living people
Women's association football midfielders
Taiwanese women's footballers
Sportspeople from Taoyuan City
Chinese Taipei women's international footballers
Asian Games competitors for Chinese Taipei
Footballers at the 2018 Asian Games